Deviot is a locality and small rural community in the local government area of West Tamar, in the Western Tamar Valley region of Tasmania. The Tamar River forms the eastern and north-eastern boundaries. The 2016 census determined a population of 337 for the state suburb of Deviot.

History
The locality was gazetted in 1967. Its name may be derived from a property named "Deviot House" which once existed in the district. The word "deviot" is believed to be a derivative of "devious".

Road infrastructure
The C729 route (Motor Road) runs north-east from the West Tamar Highway and passes through the locality.

References

Localities of West Tamar Council
Towns in Tasmania